is a Japanese tokusatsu television series. It was the seventeenth production in the long-running Super Sentai metaseries of television tokusatsu dramas produced by Toei Company, following Kyōryū Sentai Zyuranger. It was originally broadcast from February 19, 1993, to February 11, 1994, replacing Kyōryū Sentai Zyuranger and was replaced by Ninja Sentai Kakuranger. Toei gave this series the name Star Rangers for international distribution.

Elements from Dairanger were adapted into the second season of Mighty Morphin Power Rangers, specifically the action sequences between the giant robots (which became the Power Rangers' Thunderzords) and some of the monsters. None of the Dairanger costumes were used in Power Rangers, except Kiba Ranger, which was adapted into the White Ranger's costume for Mighty Morphin Power Rangers for the remainder of Season 2 and throughout Season 3, while the suits from the previous season, Kyōryū Sentai Zyuranger were instead used for the other Rangers in that show (The end credits listed the show as titled Dai Rangers). Although the Aura Changer was adapted as the Magna Morpher in “Power Rangers Lost Galaxy”, the core Dairanger costumes in the footage were not used in Power Rangers until Power Rangers Super Megaforce.

In July 2015, Shout! Factory announced that they would release "Gosei Sentai Dairanger: The Complete Series" on DVD in North America. On November 10, 2015, Dairanger was released on DVD in North America. This is the second Super Sentai series to be released in North America. In addition on May 23, 2016, Shout! streamed the series on their website.

Story
However, one day, the Gorma Tribe decided to take over the Daos Empire and the world, beginning the war between the Gorma and Dai tribes. The war between the Gorma, led by the Gorma Triumvarate, and the Dai continued for 5,000 years until the Mythical Qi Beasts appeared to oppose the Gorma, whose qi powers had increased to the point that they could turn themselves into monsters. Five Dai warriors' qi powers had increased to the point where they could control the Mythical Qi Beasts. The war ended with the disappearance of both the Dai and Gorma tribes and the Shura scattered around the world. In the present day, the Gorma Tribe, one of the Daos' two missing branches, arose to take over the world. To counter them, Master Kaku assembled a team of five youths with high levels of qi, who became the Dairangers.

Characters

Dairangers

The Dairangers are human practitioners of Chinese martial arts who possess high levels of qi powers against the Gorma Tribe. After their final battle, the Dairangers separated, with the last scene of the series showing them fifty years in the future in which their grandchildren follow the Dairangers' legacy and fight against the last remnants of the Gorma Tribe.

Ryo
 is the team leader who is the son of Choryo and a human woman. Initially, he was completely unaware of his Dai heritage as his mother died prior to the series' beginning leaving him to raise his younger sister, Yōko, by himself. He aspires to become the best gyoza cook in Japan and works in Yokohama Chinatown. Ryo became a Dairanger after he was captured by Baron String, only to be saved by the Mythical Qi Beast RyuseiOh and taken to Master Kaku. Ryo deeply trusts his teammates. As the red-colored , he specializes in the Dragon Fist style and uses the powers of fire and thunder.

Daigo
 is the second-in-command who is the gentlest and most serious member of the team. He works at a pet shop and becomes romantically involved with Kujaku. Daigo was recruited as a Dairanger after Kaku discovered his qi connection with Kujaku. As the green-colored , he specializes in the Hung Ga style and uses illusions in combat.

Shoji
 is a former delinquent who dreams of becoming a world boxing champion after reforming from his past as a member of a violent street gang. He has a strong sense of fair play and competitiveness, only applicable with Kazu. He is strong, balanced, playful and loving. Boss Kamikaze, of the Three Gorma Stooges, sees him as his greatest rival. As the blue-colored , he specializes in the Long Fist style with the power to manipulate the gravitational forces around him, thus increasing his strength and speed. Shoji appeared in the final episode of Kaizoku Sentai Gokaiger, receiving his powers back in the form of the Tenma Ranger Key as the Gokaigers left Earth.

Kazu
 is a stylish beautician and dancer. He left home at the age of 15 and traveled to Tokyo. He has a tendency to go rushing into battle without thinking. He helped an old lady who sheltered him when he ran away from his home. As the yellow-colored , he specializes in the Drunken Fist style and has the ability to freeze and reverse the flow of time to prevent mishaps. Kazu appeared in the final episode of Kaizoku Sentai Gokaiger, receiving his powers back in the form of the Kirin Ranger Key as the Gokaigers left Earth.

Rin
 is Master Kaku's niece and the only member of the team capable of qi control when not transformed. She came to Japan to be a Dairanger in the guise of an exchange student from China. She hates living with Kou, as he tends to dab in front of her, but later befriends him. She once fell in love with photographer Shōichiro Takamura, the alter ego of Gorma agent . As the pink-colored , she specializes in the Eagle Fist style and uses the power of wind.

Kou
 is a 10-year-old boy who is the "Child of Fate" for drawing the sentient  from his resting place, becoming the adult-like, white-colored . He lived with his adoptive grandparents prior to moving into Rin's apartment. A somewhat perverted boy, he is infatuated with Rin and "playfully" harasses her much to her chagrin. New to fighting, he is not particularly strong. Kou initially kept his identity a secret from the other Dairangers, with Byakko Shinken speaking in his stead to appear more grown up. After the other Dairangers learned of his identity, he began to speak on his own and joined the team. Shadam eventually learned Kou was his son and Akomaru's twin brother, although Kou himself was never aware of this. As a result of this knowledge, Shadam tried to recruit Kou into the Gorma on his tenth birthday, but his mother's baptism purified him of his Gorma lineage. As Kiba Ranger, Kou specializes in sound-based attacks.

Mythical Qi Beasts
: Ryu Ranger's personal Chinese dragon-themed Mythical Qi Beast that can transform into the humanoid  form.
: Shishi Ranger's personal Chinese guardian lions-themed Mythical Qi Beast.
: Tenma Ranger's personal Tianma-themed Mythical Qi Beast.
: Kirin Ranger's personal Qilin-themed Mythical Qi Beast.
: Houou Ranger's personal Fenghuang-themed Mythical Qi Beast.
: Kiba Ranger's personal White Tiger-themed Mythical Qi Beast that can transform into the humanoid Mythical Qi Warrior form.
: The oldest Black Tortoise-themed  that can transform into the humanoid  form. Daimugen can also assume the forms of a small turtle and a human named .
: The combination of Sei-Jishi, Sei-Tenma, Sei-Kirin, and Sei-Houou. RyuseiOh can ride it.
: The combination of RyuseiOh and Tenku Kiden.
: The combination of Won Tiger and Tenku Kiden.
: The combination of RyuseiOh, Tenku Kiden, Won Tiger, and Daimugen.

Allies

Kaku
Once Gara and Zydos destroyed the towers, Kaku was defeated and mortally wounded in the battle against Shadam, and later died in the arms of the Dairangers. He later appeared in spirit form to the Dairangers and told them that Gorma must be thwarted rather than be destroyed.

Choryo
 was the previous Ryu Ranger who joined the Gorma and became immortal as a result. 20 years prior to the events of the series, he fell in love with a human who gave birth to his son Ryo and daughter . After Yoko was born, Choryo was summoned back to the Gorma by his master, Archbishop Riju, to fight the Dairangers after the Triumvirate failed to do so, but stopped upon hearing his son is the new Ryu Ranger. Choryo eventually saw the error of his ways and turned on his master. During the ensuing fight, he received a fatal blow and collapsed. Dying in Ryo's arms, the four spirits of the other original Dairangers appeared to Choryo to tell him they forgave him. He then passed on the knowledge of DairenOh to the new Dairangers before he died.

Kujaku
 is a follower of Mahamayuri Vidyaraja, the Peacock Wisdom Queen and a master of kenpo. Gara joined the Gorma and through deception, trapped Kujaku in Mirror Make-Up Artist, causing Kujaku to swore revenge, resulting in her losing her compassion and love during her 6,000 years of imprisonment. Kujaku was freed by Daigo and attempted to murder Gara in revenge for her imprisonment until Daigo's perseverance and a little girl's kindness caused her to have a change of heart. Kujaku then resumed looking for the Sacred Peacock's Tears, realizing that she was dying from the Earth's pollutants and evil. Unfortunately, Kujaku realized that she would sicken and die even if she drank the Sacred Peacock's Tears, causing her to use the artifact to restore Gara's beauty instead. Kujaku then died with the real Gara at her side. Kujaku would later reappear in spirit form to restore Daigo's faith and plead with him not to take revenge.

Guhon
 is Rin's great grand-uncle and Kaku's mentor, who tends to be bizarre at times and often cracks his neck. Prior to the Kabuki Boy incident, Guhon entrusted his fiancé Shokyo with Byakko Shinken which he placed within a stone until the rightful owner (Kou) could claim the weapon. Guhon later revealed to Kameo his true identity as Daimugen.

Shokyo
 is Guhon's 29-year-old fiancé, a Chinese Opera writer whom he entrusted with Byakko Shinken. Her profession caught the eye of Kabuki Boy, who abducted her, although Guhon won her back. After returning Byakko Shinken to Guhon, Shokyo marries him as she returns to China.

Kou's mother
Kou's mother is married to Shadam and is a member of the Dai Tribe. She possessed a strong qi. She placed a tiger tattoo on Kou at birth to suppress his Gorma-inherited powers and had him adopted after his birth to prevent the Gorma from tracking him down. Kou's mother was taken captive by an elderly Gorma and Akōmaru. She escaped when Shadam broke into her prison to discover the source of Akōmaru's information. She later used Byakoshinken to save a wounded Kou and to purge the Gorma powers from him. She died in a cave collapse along with Akōmaru.

The Gorma Tribe
The  are the antagonists of the series. Eight thousand years ago they were the military of the three tribes but decided to take the world for themselves and destroy the other two. The Gorma are humans who have mastered  and gained the ability to become monsters. Their leader is the Gorma Emperor with many other divisions under him. However, it was revealed that most of the higher aristocracy had been killed centuries before the series even began. It was thought that Shadam had secretly made clay versions of them all in a bid to be emperor himself. However, as he himself turned out to be clay, it's debatable who created the clay copies. While the You Power the Gorma uses gives them great power, it also has damaged their mental stability, as the most powerful Gorma are almost completely insane as seen with the Gorma Emperor and those before him due to the

Gorma XV
He is an extremely powerful entity, though a bit insane. The insanity was an inherent aspect of all the Gorma's past fourteen emperors due to the power of the Earth Shaking Jewel which supplies the Emperor with an unlimited supply of "You Power" for him to live, though only few actually know the truth. The Emperor was more of a sadistic, heartless creature with a "playful" outlook on things. However, the Emperor got more serious when he saw Shadam's intention to overthrow him. He was hoping for Shadam to fall to their enemies so he can rule the world forever. But when Shadam became next in line and demanded the Earth Shaking Jewel, the Emperor refuses and attempts to use the jewel to kill Shadam himself. However, The Emperor's own conceit was a flaw as Shadam revealed he recreated the Emperor from clay, only letting him live until Shadam became Emperor himself and Gorma's official leader. With that revelation, Shadam managed to steal the Earth Shaking Jewel while the former Emperor is reduced to clay dust.

Gorma Triumvirate
The , who are part of the Military Level (Kaku also belongs to this level), help spear head the Gorma's attack on humans. In episode 30, they get to wield the spiritual powers of Hell.

Shadam
 is the leader of the Gorma Triumvirate and the real father of Akomaru and Kou. He was also the one who spearheaded the Gorma attack against the Dai Tribe in China. He hates humans for their weaknesses and can assume a fighting form, with a mask that practically covers his face.
Shadam's motivation in Gorma was to reach higher rankings until he became the 16th Gorma Emperor, deposing the competition in any way possible. He eventually realized his dream and the power of the Gorma Emperor once he defeated Kaku and disposed the previous once he is resurrected so he can become his successor. As , he intended to use the Earth Shaking Jewel to take over the world despite suffering its mind-warping effects, fighting the Dairangers. But when Daijinryu appears, the Earth Shaking Jewel left Shadam to appease Daijinryu's wrath. A maddened Shadam attempted to escape, only to be encountered by Ryo in a one-way knife duel between them. Shadam lost and died on his own knife, revealing that he was actually a clay figure made long ago. As his body crumbled to dust, only an electricity-vibrating human eyeball remained among the pile of dirt. Shadam was revealed to have been responsible for making clay copies of the Gorma higher ranks, as most of them died years ago but since Shadam too was a clay copy, it's not known what happened to the real Shadam and who created the copies.

Gara
 is the female member of the Gorma Triumvirate, though she was actually a clay copy of the original Gara and a former member of the Dai Tribe who joined Gorma at age 10 when she believed that her friend Kujaku abandoned her after she was scarred in the face while protecting her, getting revenge with Mirror-Makeup Artist's aid. When Gara died soon after, Shadam created the one that the Dairangers would face in the present time, identical to the original in every way. She created a copy of herself called  for a short time by dripping her own blood onto a small doll made of straw. During the final battle, Gara learned the truth of her existence as the "Real Gara" appeared and used her power to reduce Gara into dust.

Zydos
 is the strongman, brutal and prone to deep thinking. He was a key player amongst the Gorma because of his power and he could create extremely dangerous new Gorma like Jin. He believed utterly in Shadam as his leader, but was also prone to doing his own things. He has trouble controlling the 3 Gorma Idiots as they tend to botch the plans due to their competitive nature. He was nearly killed by Jukou Kiden, but he survived. During the match between Shadam and Kaku, Zydos was sent to destroy the power booster Kaku intended to use in the match. Though he barely survived Jukou Kiden for the second time, Zydos died when he turned into his true form: a clay figure created by Shadam as he remembered him.

Senate Level
The highest level next to the Emperor. Priests, Imperial Guards, Minister's Secretaries, and Archbishop Saw belong on this level.

Archbishop Saw
The  was an insane Gorma of higher rank than the Gorma Triumvirate, and Choryo's master. After his pupil failed to kill the Dairangers, Riju took matters to his own hands. He would have succeeded had Choryo not attacked him when he was attacking Ryo. First to be killed by DairenOh.

General Denpou
 is second-in-command to the Emperor and Akomaru's teacher/guardian. He was killed by Shadam when Denpou saw what he was doing to a resting Gorma XV and noticed the clay hand that exposed the Emperor as a clay copy.

Akomaru
 is a Gorma child who is the son of Shadam, though the two despise each other fiercely. Shadam apparently had Akomaru put up for adoption when he was born, and was now under General Denpou's wing. In fact, Akomaru is ranked higher than his father. He wants to replace his father as the Gorma military leader. He first appears to take the power of the Kiba Ranger, knowing Kou has it and aware of their relation and wanted Kou to fight by his side as brothers. Unfortunately, Akomaru saw that Kou seemed unable to hate and it annoyed him. Akomaru was killed when he was crushed by a boulder, with Kou at his side. Later the Gorma Emperor brought Akomaru back from Hell prior to his tenth birthday, when he, after having absorbed Hell's Spirit Power which made him more powerful, and Kou came into their adult power as Gorma, Akomaru using his powers to manipulate Kou in his dreams. Akomaru was made to believe that his mother abandoned him to a father who never cared about him. After losing Kou's mother to the Dairanger, Gorma XV banished Akomaru from the Gorma. Akomaru gave the Dairangers quite a battle when he rode atop his bodyguard Ikazuchi, via "You-Power Fusion". After Ikazuchi died, Akomaru learned the truth that his mother abandoned him because of a taboo that one twin must be killed so the other can have the power of both. So their mother decided to save them, with Akomaru to live as a Gorma and Kou as a normal human. But Akomaru was soon mortally injured by Shadam, limping into the cave collapsing on itself and dying in the embrace of his dying mother with the knowledge that he was loved.

Three Court Ladies of Hell
The  are three sisters who served as Akomaru's bodyguards/nannies, mistress of the 3-as-1 fighting style. They were sent to try to prevent Kiba Ranger being born, and later to track him down as part of Akomaru's scheme of drafting him.

: The youngest sister, she is able to shoot her hair to grab opponents in a constrictor hold. Mortally wounded by Kiba Ranger after she found out his true identity, she died from massive bloodloss before she could tell Akomaru.
: The middle sister, she is able to extend her neck to great lengths & possesses telescopic vision in her third eye. She disguised herself as the abusing and indifferent mother of Akomaru's "Kasumi guise". She is killed by DairenOh.
: The eldest sister, she was able to create energy rings to lasso her opponents. After her two sisters died, Lady Ring vowed to avenge them. Using their possessions, Lady Ring could create "phantom" versions of her sisters to fight with her. Using this ability she easily defeated Won Tiger, but later became first to be killed by Kibadaioh.

Gorma Four Heavenly Kings
They attempted to use their illusions to trap the Dairangers with key figures (Kujaku, Jin, Three Gorma Stooges, and Akomaru) individually. Their teamwork skills were their greatest power, as they could merge into one deadly four-headed entity called . They survived the attack of Kibadaioh twice, but were soon the first to be killed by Jukou Kiden.

Thunderbolt
 is Akomaru's insectoid bodyguard, this monster fought the Kiba Ranger-less Dairangers. He obtained his name from the fact that he can fire lightning from parts of his body, powerful enough to attract Daijinryu and the Gorma-infested Kiba Ranger's attention. He was winning until Kiba Ranger was purified and rejoined the team, thus killing Ikazuchi with Jukou Kiden.

Imperial Guard
In episode 49, the armors of Kaku and Shiryu are brought to life and are metal-colored by Shadam who sends them against the Dairangers. They are defeated by Shoji, Kazu, and Ryo and disappear.

: One of the leaders of the Imperial Guard, Shiryu is a member of the Marching Men. He was Kaku's supporter amongst the Gorma. He had Hercules-like strength and from his eye beams the power of the monster-strength of the Gorma. He dies fighting DairenOh to Kaku's horror.

Three Gorma Stooges
The  are three Gorma in the service of Zydos, though their foolishness deemed them at lower ranks; they all have a sense of competition and honor. Furthermore, to make them less respectable, none of them can assume human form like their fellow Gorma.

They were beaten by RyuseiOh the first time and Kibadaioh the second time. Though they survived both fights, the trio ended up being bandaged up. Over the course of the series, they would gain respect for the Dairangers (and vice versa); specifically for Shoji, who was seen as the most competitive of the Dairangers. After all that happened to them, they managed to survive the entire series after being blown up various times. Deep down, they never wanted to kill the Dairangers, just defeat them in contests and sports.

They would finally settle things with the Dairangers in a bike race, though they made their peace with the Dairangers using the minefield Zydos placed on the finish line to fake their deaths. The trio later returned to help Shoji.

: The motorcycle-themed leader of the group who rides a motorcycle. He tends to use "baby" in his sentences.
: The tombstone-themed/right-hand man of the group; he can open his head to reveal a variety of things.
: Kamikaze's telephone-themed "girl", able to control any phone to spy on people or attack from long distances.

Gorma Monsters

Jin Matoba
His favorite targets were martial arts masters, as his own master cut off his left arm. Jin got a prosthesis, perfected his arts and went on a campaign to slaughter other masters who were too hard on their students to return and kill his first teacher. His trademark was to flip a coin into the air and kill his opponent before it landed. But the man foiled that plan by dying before Jin got around to it. But that all changed the day he met Ryo and was defeated by him. Later, Jin sold his soul to Zydos to become stronger than Ryo, becoming  after punching , a young nurse who was the only person who cared for him. But Jin refused to be Gorma's lapdog and perfected his new-found powers on his own, after which he went hunting for Ryo. But Zydos captured the rogue and infused him with more Gorma power, turning him into . Unlike the normally born Gorma, Jin's transformation was against his will and thus he was unable to control himself as Garouki. As Garouki, Jin is like a totally obedient dog for Zydos with a desire to kill and eat his victims. Jin was soon freed of his "Gorma-incarnation" thanks to Ryo's attack separating the monster from his body. While Jin fought Zydos, with Garouki destroyed by the Qi-Power Bazooka, he was mortally wounded. After one final bout with Ryo, Jin went on the run from the Gorma. Jin was last seen fighting the bulk of an entire army of Cotpotros led by Zydos, only to be seemingly gunned down by the second wave. But Jin later appeared to Ryo and proceeded to beat sense into him for not giving up despite no longer being a Dairanger.

Cotpotros
The  are Gorma grunts in black tuxedo tights with lipped but otherwise blank black and white faces. They would disguise as humans and serve virtually any Gorma, including the Three Gorma Stooges, serving as players in their various games. In the finale, the Dairangers faced red-dressed Cotpotros in the palace. The group were later summoned by Zaigan during Super Sentai World.

Daijinryu
 is a colossal god-like entity who preserves the natural balance of the world, referred to as the "Great King of Fear that will destroy the Earth" by Kameo/Daimugen. He appears whenever battles have gone too far, like the ones between the Dairangers and the Gorma. Daijinryu is a neutral being, but has no tolerance for whoever threatens to disrupt the natural order of things.

He is also capable of firing lightning bolts with immense destructive power. During his first appearance, he attacks  and RyuseiOh. The universe's will that he obeyed told him that the two warring factions had to agree a cease-fire, so Daijinryu would spare the lives of everyone on Earth and the planet itself, but he gave a warning to both the Dairangers and the Gorma not to incur his wrath by destroying most of Tokyo.

The annoyed dragon crushed the monster to death under his massive foot, then turned and disassembled DairenOh with a lightning bolt. He then attempted to crush RyuseiOh (the only Mythical Qi Beast left standing). RyuseiOh was saved by Daimugen, who hid RyuseiOh inside of his shell, but was nearly crushed by Daijinryu. Daijinryu let them live because of the universe's will and the truce between the Dairangers and the Gorma.

When the Dairangers dealt with Ikazuchi, Daijinryu seemingly put many civilians in Tokyo under his control, lining them up on top of buildings to fall to their deaths, before Kaku counter-acted the spell. Daijinryu made his final appearance to destroy the Gorma Palace, seeing that Shadam and the Gorma were the cause of all the trouble. To calm him down, the Lailai Balls and the Great Earth Shaking Jewel scattered to the four winds on their own will.

Episodes

Movie
The film version of Gosei Sentai Dairanger premiered in Japan on April 17, 1993, at Toei Super Hero Fair '93. Directed by Shōhei Tōjō and written by Noboru Sugimura, the movie was originally shown as a triple feature alongside Kamen Rider ZO and the film version of Tokusou Robo Janperson. While the movie was filmed between episodes 5–8, its story actually takes place between episodes 8 and 9 due to the appearance of DairenOh. Shōhei Shibata, the young actor who played Hiroshi Mochizuki in ZO later joined the cast of Dairanger as Akomaru, son of the main villain Shadam.

Cast
Ryo of the Heavenly Fire Star: 
Daigo of the Heavenly Illusion Star: 
Shoji of the Heavenly Gravity Star: 
Kazu of the Heavenly Time Star: 
Rin of the Heavenly Wind Star: 
Kou of the Howling New Star: 
Master Kaku: 
Commander Shadam: 
Commander Gara: 
Lieutenant Commander Zydos: 
Kameo: , 
Grandmaster Guhon: 
Kou's mother: 
Jin Matoba: 
Kujaku: 
Akomaru: 
General Denpou: 
Gorma XV:

Voice actors
Byakko Shinken: 
General Kamikaze: 
President Gravestone: 
Master Telephone: 
Narration:

Guest actors

Archbishop Riju (7 & 8): 
: 
: 
Human form of :

Songs
Opening theme

Lyrics: 
Composition: 
Arrangement: 
Artist: 

Ending theme

Lyrics: Saburo Yatsude
Composition: Katsuo Ōno
Arrangement: Kenji Yamamoto
Artist: New Jack Takurō

International Broadcast and Home Video
The series aired with in Indonesia with an Indonesian dub on RCTI under the Star Ranger title.
In Thailand, the series aired on Channel 9 in 1995 with a Thai dub despite the popularity of the American-produced Power Rangers.
The series aired in Hong Kong with a Cantonese Chinese dub from October 16, 1995 until December 26, 1995 on Asia Television with all 50 episodes dubbed.
In North America, the series was released on DVD by Shout! Factory presented with the original Japanese audio with English subtitles on November 10, 2015. This was the second Super Sentai series to get an official release in its' unadapted Power Rangers form, following Kyōryū Sentai Zyuranger.
In the Philippines, it has aired on RPN-9 on February 4, 2019 through July 31, 2020. It also aired on TV5 on June 3, 2019 through August 14, 2020.

See also
 Mighty Morphin Power Rangers (season 2)
 Mighty Morphin Power Rangers: The Movie

Notes

References

External links

 Official website at Super Sentai.net 
 Official Shout! Factory page
 Official Shout Factory TV page

Super Sentai
1993 Japanese television series debuts
1994 Japanese television series endings
TV Asahi original programming
Martial arts television series
Chinese mythology in popular culture
Japanese action television series
Japanese fantasy television series
Japanese science fiction television series
1990s Japanese television series
Works about legendary creatures